Alfonso Fernández Fernández (born 15 April 1951) is a Spanish boxer. He competed in the men's welterweight event at the 1972 Summer Olympics.

References

External links
 

1951 births
Living people
Spanish male boxers
Olympic boxers of Spain
Boxers at the 1972 Summer Olympics
Place of birth missing (living people)
Mediterranean Games silver medalists for Spain
Mediterranean Games medalists in boxing
Competitors at the 1971 Mediterranean Games
Welterweight boxers
20th-century Spanish people